
Santa Maria Assunta is a church  in the north-west of Esine, in the province of Brescia, northern Italy, listed as national monument.

The building was originally constructed around 1480, and initially had a gabled façade with a round window (oculo), replaced by the current structure in 1776. The bell tower dates from 1500 and is built in a yellow stone.

The interior has a single nave, and was apparently completely decorated with frescoes by Giovanni Pietro da Cemmo between 1491 and 1493: subjects include the Annunciation, Mary enthroned, the history of salvation and the holy helpers. The paintings were commissioned by the noble families of Federici and Beccagutti, and by Isaac de Favis of Gandino, rector of the church of the Holy Trinity in Esine.

Beyond the chancel arch the cross vault of the presbytery bears in its centre a depiction of Christ Pantocrator in a mandorla, over three meters high, surrounded by a crowd of 72 characters arranged in distinct classes: saints, martyrs, patriarchs, emperors, prophets, and so on. On the back wall of the chancel is  painted the Crucifixion.

In 1573 a section of wall was knocked down to build the Chapel of the Rosary, destroying the fresco, which probably represented a Last Judgement.

Gallery

Notes

Sources and external links

Religious buildings and structures completed in 1480
Roman Catholic churches completed in 1730
Maria
Maria Assunta
15th-century Roman Catholic church buildings in Italy
18th-century Roman Catholic church buildings in Italy